Phyllonorycter dakekanbae is a moth of the family Gracillariidae. It is known from Hokkaidō island in Japan and the Russian Far East.

The wingspan is about 7.5 mm.

The larvae feed on Betula ermanii and Betula platyphylla var. japonica. They mine the leaves of their host plant. The mine has the form of a ptychonomous blotch mine on the upperside of the leaf.

References

dakekanbae
Moths of Asia

Moths of Japan
Moths described in 1963
Taxa named by Tosio Kumata
Leaf miners